Thiago Esmerindo de Souza de Brito, known as Thiago Brito (born 20 August 1992), is a Brazilian professional footballer who plays for Manaus as a forward.

Club career
Born in Eldorado dos Carajás, Pará, Brito graduated with Santos' youth setup, after starting it out at Figueirense. He made his senior debuts with Pinheiros in the Campeonato Catarinense's third level, and moved to Uberaba in November 2011.

In July 2012 Brito moved to Grêmio Barueri, on loan until the end of the season. He made his debut as a professional on the 7th, coming on as a second-half substitute in a 0–4 away loss against Joinville.

Brito scored his first professional goals six days later, netting a brace in a 3–0 away success against Ipatinga. He was bought outright at the end of the season.

On 22 September 2014 Brito was presented at Portuguesa. He only appeared rarely, and was released in December.

On 4 February 2015 Brito returned to Santos, signing a two-year contract and being immediately loaned to Al-Nasr SC.

References

External links

LTT Soccer profile 
Thiago Brito at ZeroZero

1992 births
Living people
Sportspeople from Pará
Brazilian footballers
Association football forwards
Campeonato Brasileiro Série B players
Campeonato Brasileiro Série C players
Campeonato Brasileiro Série D players
Uberaba Sport Club players
Grêmio Barueri Futebol players
Associação Portuguesa de Desportos players
Santos FC players
Vila Nova Futebol Clube players
Campinense Clube players
Oman Professional League players
Al-Musannah SC players
União Recreativa dos Trabalhadores players
Manaus Futebol Clube players
Birkirkara F.C. players
Maltese Premier League players
Brazilian expatriate footballers
Brazilian expatriate sportspeople in Kuwait
Brazilian expatriate sportspeople in Oman
Brazilian expatriate sportspeople in Malta
Expatriate footballers in Kuwait
Expatriate footballers in Oman
Expatriate footballers in Malta
Kuwait Premier League players
Al-Nasr SC (Kuwait) players